The Martin Luther King Bridge (formerly known as the Veterans Bridge) in St. Louis, Missouri, is a cantilever truss bridge of about  in total length across the Mississippi River, connecting St. Louis with East St. Louis, Illinois. Opened in 1951, the bridge serves as traffic relief connecting the concurrent freeways of Interstate 55, Interstate 64, and U.S. Route 40 with the downtown streets of St. Louis. It was renamed for King in 1968 after the national civil rights leader was assassinated that year.

History
The bridge was built across the Mississippi River in 1951 as the Veterans' Memorial Bridge to relieve congestion on the MacArthur Bridge to the south. Built as a toll bridge, it was owned by the City of East St. Louis.  At one time, it carried U.S. Route 40 and U.S. Route 66 across the river. In 1967, the bridge fell into disrepair after the (free) Poplar Street Bridge was completed; traffic moved to the new bridge, resulting in declining toll revenues needed for maintenance.

Eventually, ownership was transferred dually to the Missouri and Illinois departments of Transportation. The bridge was renamed after Martin Luther King Jr. in 1968,  after the national civil rights leader's April 1968 assassination in Memphis, Tennessee. In 1987, the states removed the toll for travel across the bridge. A bi-state project for about $24 million to renovate the bridge, at the behest of local civic and government leaders, was carried out in the late 1980s. In the spring of 1989, the rebuilt bridge was reopened. In June 1990, the lighting of the bridge was completed by the St. Louis Port Authority. In the 21st century, it is considered an important contributor to satisfying the transportation needs of the region and enhancing the ambiance of the historic St. Louis riverfront.

On October 12, 2009, the bridge was closed in order to reduce the old four-lane configuration down to three wider lanes, install a waterproofing membrane over the bridge surface Martin Luther King Bridge To Reopen Early After Repairs - KTVI, and to install a concrete barrier to separate eastbound traffic from westbound. Over the previous six years, there had been 38 serious accidents, including several involving fatalities. The $1.4 million project was aimed at eliminating these head-on collisions in the future. The bridge re-opened on October 21, 2009.

After the new Stan Musial Veterans Memorial Bridge opened in February 2014 across the river, daily traffic volume on the King bridge had decreased by 40% by April 2014 to 12,700 daily. This was one of the goals of construction of the new bridge: to distribute traffic more widely among the bridges and associated roadways, improving traffic patterns.

In October 2018, the bridge was closed to all traffic to allow an extensive rehabilitation project to take place. Among other things, this project would replace the deck surface and put a fresh coat of pavement on the roadway, as well as replacing the extensively deteriorated eastern approach spans, and repainting the entire bridge. The bridge was originally expected to reopen to traffic in January 2019. However, due to flooding, the date of reopening was pushed to summer of 2020. The bridge eventually reopened on August 19, 2020.

Gallery

Route 799

The Missouri half of the bridge is designated as unsigned Route 799 by the Missouri Department of Transportation.

See also
 
 
 
 
 List of crossings of the Upper Mississippi River
 McKinley Bridge
 Eads Bridge
 Poplar Street Bridge
 Stan Musial Veterans Memorial Bridge

References

External links

Bridge info at Historic Bridges of the Midwest.
maps.google.com zoomed in, hybrid mode

Road bridges in Illinois
Bridges over the Mississippi River
East St. Louis, Illinois
Bridges on U.S. Route 66
Bridges completed in 1951
Bridges in St. Louis
Bridges in St. Clair County, Illinois
Road bridges in Missouri
U.S. Route 40
Former toll bridges in Illinois
Former toll bridges in Missouri
Concrete bridges in the United States
Cantilever bridges in the United States
Interstate vehicle bridges in the United States